Kara Odom Walker is a family physician and the Chief Population Health Officer at Nemours Alfred I. duPont Hospital for Children, leading their National Office of Policy and Prevention. From February 2017 to June 2020, she served as Secretary of the Delaware Department of Health and Social Services. Prior to holding that position, she served as the Deputy Chief Science Officer at the Patient-Centered Outcomes Research Institute (PCORI) In 2018, she was elected to the National Academy of Medicine.

Education 
Odom Walker attended high school in Glasgow, Delaware and graduated as valedictorian from Caravel Academy high school. She then attended the University of Delaware where she received her bachelor's degree in chemical engineering in 1999. She then attended Jefferson Medical College, where she received her Doctor of Medicine in 2004. During that time, she also received a Master of Public Health degree in Health Policy and Management from Johns Hopkins University in 2003.

Odom Walker then moved to California to complete her residency training specializing in family medicine at the University of California, San Francisco. She then became a Robert Wood Johnson Clinical Fellow at the University of California, Los Angeles, where she also completed a Masters of Health Services Research in 2009. During her time there, she studied hospital closures impacted underserved minority populations.

Career 
In 2010, Odom Walker became an Assistant Clinical Professor in Family and Community Medicine at University of California, San Francisco, researching health disparities and working to understand how best to provide high quality, coordinated care with patients' needs in mind. In 2012, Odom Walker became a Program Officer at the Patient-Centered Outcomes Research Institute (PCORI) and became Deputy Chief Science Officer in 2013. After 5 years of service at PCORI, Odom Walker transitioned to public service.

On February 6, 2017, Odom Walker was sworn in as Secretary of the Delaware Department of Health and Services, working under the administration of Governor John Carney. As Secretary, she has worked to develop policies and programs to prioritize patient outcomes in Delaware's healthcare system. In this role, she has overseen Delaware's response to the Coronavirus disease 2019 (COVID-19) pandemic, paying special attention to elderly citizens and vulnerable populations. In March 2020, she also warned that half of Delaware's positive COVID-19 tests were among people aged 18 to 49, urging caution among younger populations that may have thought they had low risk of developing serious symptoms.

In June 2020, Odom Walker stepped down from her post as  Delaware Health Secretary to begin a position at the Washington branch of Nemours Children's Health System as Senior Vice President and Chief Health Officer.

Awards & honors 

 Elected Fellow, National Academy of Medicine, 2018

References 

Living people
Year of birth missing (living people)
American physicians
Jefferson Medical College alumni
University of Delaware alumni
University of California, Los Angeles alumni
Johns Hopkins School of Medicine alumni
Government of Delaware
Women in medicine
African-American physicians
21st-century African-American people
Members of the National Academy of Medicine